The Otranto Bridge was located northwest of St. Ansgar, Iowa, United States. The supervisors from Mitchell County contracted with the Chicago Bridge and Iron Company (CBI) to build two bridges in the county. Chicago engineer Horace E. Horton from CBI designed this Camelback through truss bridge. It replaced and older span at the same location, and it was completed in 1899 for $3,257. The Otranto Bridge was one of the few Camelback through truss bridges built in Iowa. It was replaced by a modern bridge and was privately owned before being dismantled.

The bridge was listed on the National Register of Historic Places in 1998. It was removed in 2020.

References

Bridges completed in 1899
Buildings and structures in Mitchell County, Iowa
National Register of Historic Places in Mitchell County, Iowa
Road bridges on the National Register of Historic Places in Iowa
Truss bridges in Iowa
Parker truss bridges in the United States
Former National Register of Historic Places in Iowa